Rod Fai Don Tri or Music Train is a record label in Thailand. It was formed in 1979 by former DJ Prasert Pongthananikorn. Pongthananikorn worked for EMI before founding his own label. The most famous artists of Rod Fai Don Tri are Sao Sao Sao and Pongsit Kamphee.

References

External links
www.musictrain.co.th

Thai record labels
Companies based in Bangkok
Record labels established in 1979
1979 establishments in Thailand